Agalmyla is a genus of plants in the family Gesneriaceae.

Species 
, Plants of the World Online accepted the following species:

Agalmyla affinis Hilliard & B.L.Burtt
Agalmyla aitinyuensis Hilliard & B.L.Burtt
Agalmyla ambonica Hilliard & B.L.Burtt
Agalmyla angiensis (Kaneh. & Hatus.) Hilliard & B.L.Burtt
Agalmyla angustifolia Miq.
Agalmyla aurantiaca Hilliard & B.L.Burtt
Agalmyla beccarii C.B.Clarke
Agalmyla bicolor Hilliard & B.L.Burtt
Agalmyla biflora (Elmer) Hilliard & B.L.Burtt
Agalmyla bilirana Hilliard & B.L.Burtt
Agalmyla borneensis (Schltr.) B.L.Burtt
Agalmyla bracteata (Stapf) B.L.Burtt
Agalmyla brevifolia S.Moore
Agalmyla brevipes (C.B.Clarke) B.L.Burtt
Agalmyla brownii (Koord.) B.L.Burtt
Agalmyla calelanensis (Elmer) Hilliard & B.L.Burtt
Agalmyla centralis Hilliard & B.L.Burtt
Agalmyla chalmersii (F.Muell.) B.L.Burtt
Agalmyla chorisepala (C.B.Clarke) Hilliard & B.L.Burtt
Agalmyla chrysostyla (Schltr.) Hilliard & B.L.Burtt
Agalmyla clarkei (Elmer) B.L.Burtt
Agalmyla columneoides Hilliard & B.L.Burtt
Agalmyla decipiens Hilliard & B.L.Burtt
Agalmyla dentatisepala Hilliard & B.L.Burtt
Agalmyla diandra Hilliard & B.L.Burtt
Agalmyla elegans (K.Schum. & Lauterb.) Hilliard & B.L.Burtt
Agalmyla elongata (Blume) B.L.Burtt
Agalmyla erecta B.L.Burtt
Agalmyla exannulata Hilliard & B.L.Burtt
Agalmyla formosa Hilliard & B.L.Burtt
Agalmyla gjellerupii (Schltr.) Hilliard & B.L.Burtt
Agalmyla glabra (Copel. ex Merr.) Hilliard & B.L.Burtt
Agalmyla glabrisepala Hilliard & B.L.Burtt
Agalmyla glandulosa Hilliard & B.L.Burtt
Agalmyla gracilis Hilliard & B.L.Burtt
Agalmyla hilliardiae D.J.Middleton & S.M.Scott
Agalmyla hirta Hilliard & B.L.Burtt
Agalmyla hooglenii Hilliard & B.L.Burtt
Agalmyla immersinervia Hilliard
Agalmyla inaequidentata Hilliard & B.L.Burtt
Agalmyla insularis Hilliard & B.L.Burtt
Agalmyla javanica Hilliard & B.L.Burtt
Agalmyla johannis-winkleri (Kraenzl.) B.L.Burtt
Agalmyla keysseri (Diels) Hilliard & B.L.Burtt
Agalmyla kowapiana Hilliard & B.L.Burtt
Agalmyla lavandulacea Hilliard & B.L.Burtt
Agalmyla leuserensis Hilliard & B.L.Burtt
Agalmyla lobata (Schltr.) Hilliard & B.L.Burtt
Agalmyla longiattenuata Hilliard & B.L.Burtt
Agalmyla longipetiolata Hilliard & B.L.Burtt
Agalmyla macrocalyx Hilliard & B.L.Burtt
Agalmyla macrocolon Hilliard & B.L.Burtt
Agalmyla manuselae Hilliard & B.L.Burtt
Agalmyla minor (K.Schum. & Lauterb.) Hilliard & B.L.Burtt
Agalmyla montis-tomasii Hilliard & B.L.Burtt
Agalmyla multiflora (Kaneh. & Hatus.) Hilliard & B.L.Burtt
Agalmyla murudiana Hilliard & B.L.Burtt
Agalmyla nervosa Hilliard & B.L.Burtt
Agalmyla obiana Hilliard & B.L.Burtt
Agalmyla ovata (B.L.Burtt) Hilliard & B.L.Burtt
Agalmyla parasitica (Lam.) Kuntze
Agalmyla paromoia Hilliard & B.L.Burtt
Agalmyla parvifolia (S.Moore) Hilliard & B.L.Burtt
Agalmyla parvilimba Hilliard & B.L.Burtt
Agalmyla pauciflora Hilliard & B.L.Burtt
Agalmyla paucipilosa Hilliard & B.L.Burtt
Agalmyla persimilis Hilliard & B.L.Burtt
Agalmyla porrectiloba Hilliard & B.L.Burtt
Agalmyla pseudoborneensis Hilliard & B.L.Burtt
Agalmyla pulcherrima Hilliard & B.L.Burtt
Agalmyla remotidentata Hilliard & B.L.Burtt
Agalmyla roseoflava Hilliard & B.L.Burtt
Agalmyla rotundiloba Hilliard & B.L.Burtt
Agalmyla rubra (Merr.) B.L.Burtt
Agalmyla samarica Hilliard & B.L.Burtt
Agalmyla scabriflora Hilliard & B.L.Burtt
Agalmyla schlechteri Hilliard & B.L.Burtt
Agalmyla serrata Hilliard & B.L.Burtt
Agalmyla sibuyanensis Hilliard & B.L.Burtt
Agalmyla similis Hilliard & B.L.Burtt
Agalmyla singularis Hilliard & B.L.Burtt
Agalmyla sojoliana Hilliard & B.L.Burtt
Agalmyla stellifera Hilliard & B.L.Burtt
Agalmyla stenosiphon Hilliard & B.L.Burtt
Agalmyla tamrauana Hilliard & B.L.Burtt
Agalmyla tobensis Hilliard & B.L.Burtt
Agalmyla torajiana Hilliard
Agalmyla triflora (Valeton) B.L.Burtt
Agalmyla tuberculata Hook.f.
Agalmyla urdanetensis (Elmer) Hilliard & B.L.Burtt
Agalmyla valetoniana (Lauterb.) Hilliard & B.L.Burtt
Agalmyla villosa (Schltr.) Hilliard & B.L.Burtt
Agalmyla vogelii Hilliard & B.L.Burtt
Agalmyla wekariensis Hilliard & B.L.Burtt
Agalmyla wildeorum Hilliard & B.L.Burtt
Agalmyla wondiwoiana Hilliard & B.L.Burtt

References

External links 
 
 

Gesneriaceae genera
Didymocarpoideae